Inspector Blunder is a 1980 French comedy film directed by Claude Zidi.

Cast
 Coluche : Inspector Michel Clément / Jules Clément
 Gérard Depardieu : Roger Morzini
 Dominique Lavanant : Marie-Anne Prossant
 Julien Guiomar : Inspector Vermillot
 Alain Mottet : Dumeze 
 François Perrot : Louis Prossant
 Jean Bouchaud : Inspector Zingo
 Clément Harari : Dr. Haquenbusch
 Philippe Khorsand : Alphonse Rouchard
 Martin Lamotte : Inspector Gaffuri
 Dany Saval : The antiquarian
 Hubert Deschamps : Inspector Marcel Watrin
 Marthe Villalonga : Marthe Clément
 Richard Anconina : Philou
 Féodor Atkine : Merlino
 Richard Bohringer : The cop
 Jeanne Herviale : Denise Morzini
 Jean-Paul Lilienfeld : Libenstein
 Gabriel Gobin : The lawyer
 Gérard Holtz : Himself
 Hippolyte Girardot : A friend of Michel Clément

Production
The film was shot in Paris between 21 July and 29 September 1980.

Release
The film was released in France in 1980. The film was released on VHS in France on 1996.

Notes

External links
 

1980 films
French comedy films
1980s French-language films
Films directed by Claude Zidi
Films produced by Claude Berri
Films scored by Vladimir Cosma
1980s police comedy films
1980 comedy films
1980s French films